Congregation Beth Israel, also known as the Orchard Street Shul, is an Orthodox Jewish synagogue at 232 Orchard Street in New Haven, Connecticut.  The synagogue building is listed on the National Register of Historic Places.

The congregation was founded in 1913 by an orthodox congregation that was formed by Jewish families who had prospered sufficiently to move beyond the neighborhood of first immigrant settlement around Oak and Lafayette Streets  to the area of upper Oak Street (renamed Legion Avenue in 1928) and  Winthrop Avenue.  First meeting in leased space, in 1915 the congregation moved into a remodeled house at 147 Orchard Street. In 1923 they purchased a lot at 232 Orchard Street for $12,000 (today $) and built the present Colonial revival style building in 1925.  The architect was Louis Abramowitz and the builder was C. Abbadessa.

By the late twentieth century, the membership was elderly, the Jewish population of the city had moved elsewhere, and the future of the synagogue was in doubt.

Efforts to preserve the synagogue were organized by the Cultural Heritage Artists Project  and the synagogue returned to regular weekly use during 2011 under the leadership of Rabbi Mendy Hecht, whose grandfather Rabbi Maurice I. Hecht had been rabbi at the shul for 45 years, and whose father Rabbi Sheya Hecht had also served in the pulpit.

The synagogue was listed on the National Register of Historic Places in 1995.

The synagogue website  describes the historic restoration of the Orchard Street Shul that has taken place during 2012 and that there are traditional Shabbat services held every Saturday morning at 9:30 AM as well as on all Jewish holidays, with no tickets or membership required to attend High Holiday services.

See also
National Register of Historic Places listings in New Haven County, Connecticut

References

External links
 Orchard Street Shul

Synagogues in Connecticut
Buildings and structures in New Haven, Connecticut
National Register of Historic Places in New Haven, Connecticut
Synagogues on the National Register of Historic Places in Connecticut
Historic district contributing properties in Connecticut
1925 establishments in Connecticut
Synagogues completed in 1925
Colonial Revival architecture in Connecticut
Colonial Revival synagogues
Neoclassical architecture in Connecticut
Neoclassical synagogues